Oskar Neuenschwander (born 3 May 1918) was a Swiss rower. He competed at the 1936 Summer Olympics in Berlin with the men's eight where they came sixth.

References

External links
 

1918 births
Possibly living people
Swiss male rowers
Olympic rowers of Switzerland
Rowers at the 1936 Summer Olympics